The Babylon 5 Roleplaying Game is a role-playing game published by Mongoose Publishing in 2003.

Description
The Babylon 5 Roleplaying Game is based on the Babylon 5 TV series. The game's mechanic is the d20 System published by Wizards of the Coast with character classes and races specific to the setting. Characters have a low number of hit points meaning that they can die very easily, in keeping with the show.

Publication history
The Babylon 5 Roleplaying Game was published by Mongoose Publishing in 2003. A second edition of the core rules was published in 2006 using the WotC Open Game License. In 2008 Mongoose published Universe of Babylon 5, a set of rules allowing the game to use Mongoose's edition of Traveller as its RPG engine instead of the d20 System.

Reception
Babylon 5 won the 2004 Silver Ennie Award for "Best Licensed Product".

References

Babylon 5
British role-playing games
ENnies winners
Mongoose Publishing games
Role-playing games based on television series
Role-playing games introduced in 2003
Space opera role-playing games